Planaltinella psephena is a species of moth of the family Tortricidae. It is found in Minas Gerais, Brazil.

The wingspan is about 10.5 mm. The ground colour of the forewings is white with greyish suffusions and markings in the form of a grey dorsal blotch, suffused with pale ochreous rust medially. The hindwings are whitish with slight brownish suffusions on the periphery.

Etymology
The species name refers to the colouration of the forewings and is derived from Greek psephena (meaning dark).

References

Moths described in 2007
Cochylini